Trethewey is a surname of Cornish origin. It is derived from any of the various settlements in Cornwall called Trethewey.

Notable people with the surname include:

Fred Trethewey (born 1949), British archdeacon
Natasha Trethewey (born 1966), American poet
Richard Trethewey (born c. 1955), American plumber and television personality
Robert Trethewey (1902–1989), Australian politician
Tom Trethewey (born 1944), American swimmer
William Griffith Trethewey (1865-1926), Canadian inventor, prospector and farmer
William Trethewey (1892–1956), New Zealand sculptor and monumental mason